City Sprouts is a community garden, urban farm, and educational resource center in the Orchard Hill neighborhood of Omaha, Nebraska. Founded in 1995, City Sprouts is the oldest community garden in the city.  The organization is registered as a 501(c)(3) not-for profit entity.

The stated mission objectives of City Sprouts are:
 To increase the availability of fresh, locally grown produce
 To provide employment for at-risk youth
 To educate the community about healthy lifestyle choices
 To build community

Through gardening with City Sprouts, students are provided the opportunity to develop employment skills. The Executive Director of City Sprouts is Roxanne Williams.

History
City Sprouts formed as a group in 1995, as a response to help foster community connection after a murder that had occurred in the Orchard Hill neighborhood.
Michael V. McNealy was one of the founding members of City Sprouts.

Events
City Sprouts hosts regular events and workshops in the Learning Center, including classes on topics such as permaculture, and canning and preserving.

One of the main fundraising events for City Sprouts each year is a Gala in the fall, frequently hosted at Lauritzen Gardens.

External links
City Sprouts official website
City Sprouts on Twitter @OmahaSprouts

References

Parks in Omaha, Nebraska
1995 establishments in Nebraska